Agishev (masculine) or Agisheva (feminine) is a Russian last name, a variant of Ageyev. It is also possible that it derived from the first name Agapy or Agafon.

People with the last name
Jakov Agishev, Soviet rally driver participating at the World Rally Championship
Ravil Agishev, Soviet association football player for Pakhtakor Tashkent FK
Sagit Agishev, birth name of Sagit Agish (1904–1973), Bashkir poet, writer, and playwright
Takhir Agishev, Kazakhstani Muay Thai fighter at the Muay event at the 2014 Asian Beach Games
Vadim Agishev, Uzbekistani referee at the 2012 AFC U-16 Championship qualification
Vladimir Agishev, Soviet shooter participating at the 50 meter rifle three positions event at the 1972 Summer Olympics

References

Notes

Sources
И. М. Ганжина (I. M. Ganzhina). "Словарь современных русских фамилий" (Dictionary of Modern Russian Last Names). Москва, 2001. 

Russian-language surnames
